Eltrombopag, sold under the brand name Promacta among others, is a medication used to treat thrombocytopenia (abnormally low platelet counts) and severe aplastic anemia. Eltrombopag is sold under the brand name Revolade outside the US and is marketed by Novartis. It is a thrombopoietin receptor agonist. It is taken by mouth.

Eltrombopag was discovered as a result of research collaboration between GlaxoSmithKline and Ligand Pharmaceuticals and is transferred to Novartis Pharmaceuticals.

Medical uses 
Eltrombopag was initially approved by the U.S. Food and Drug Administration (FDA) on 20 November 2008, for the treatment of thrombocytopenia in people with chronic immune (idiopathic) thrombocytopenic purpura who have had an insufficient response to corticosteroids, immunoglobulin therapy, or splenectomy.

On 24 August 2015, the FDA approved eltrombopag (Promacta for oral suspension) for the treatment of thrombocytopenia in children one year and older with idiopathic thrombocytopenia who have had an insufficient response to corticosteroids, immunoglobulins, or splenectomy.

Development
In preclinical studies, the compound was shown to interact selectively with the thrombopoietin receptor, leading to activation of the JAK-STAT signaling pathway and increased proliferation and differentiation of megakaryocytes. Animal studies confirmed that it increased platelet counts. In 73 healthy volunteers, higher doses of eltrombopag caused larger increases in the number of circulating platelets without tolerability problems.

Clinical trials
Eltrombopag has been shown to be effective in two major clinical syndromes: idiopathic thrombocytopenic purpura (ITP) and cirrhosis due to hepatitis C (in which low platelet counts may be a contraindication for interferon treatment).

After six weeks of therapy in a phase III trial, eltrombopag 50 mg/day was associated with a significantly higher response rate than placebo in adult patients with chronic idiopathic thrombocytopenic purpura (ITP).

History 
Eltrombopag received breakthrough therapy designation from the U.S. Food and Drug Administration (FDA) in February 2014, for people with aplastic anemia for which immunosuppression has not been successful.  In 2017, the NIH made Eltrombopag a standard of care in aplastic anemia.

Research 
It has been shown to produce a trilineage hematopoiesis in some people with aplastic anemia, resulting in increased platelet counts, along with red and white blood cell counts.

References

External links 
 
 
 
 
 
 
 
 
 
 
 

Biphenyls
Breakthrough therapy
Carboxylic acids
Drugs acting on the blood and blood forming organs
GSK plc brands
Hydrazines
Novartis brands
Orphan drugs
Thrombopoietin receptor agonists